Nordling is a Swedish surname.

Geographical distribution
As of 2014, 45.0% of all known bearers of the surname Nordling were residents of Sweden (frequency 1:8,199), 32.1% of the United States (1:421,039), 16.5% of Finland (1:12,464), 1.6% of Denmark (1:131,268), 1.6% of Norway (1:119,589) and 1.3% of Australia (1:660,385).

In Sweden, the frequency of the surname was higher than national average (1:8,199) in the following counties:
 1. Västernorrland County (1:2,440)
 2. Värmland County (1:2,983)
 3. Uppsala County (1:3,463)
 4. Gotland County (1:4,177)
 5. Gävleborg County (1:5,284)
 6. Södermanland County (1:5,584)
 7. Stockholm County (1:6,989)
 8. Dalarna County (1:7,995)
 9. Blekinge County (1:8,102)
 10. Örebro County (1:8,149)

In Finland, the frequency of the surname was higher than national average (1:12,464) in the following regions:
 1. Ostrobothnia (1:2,594)
 2. Åland (1:3,229)
 3. Satakunta (1:3,812)
 4. Southwest Finland (1:6,012)
 5. Uusimaa (1:8,890)

People
 Carl O. Nordling (1919–2007), Finland-Swedish architect and statistician
 Carl Nordling, former chairman of the Nobel Committee for Physics
 Frans Hjalmar Nordling (1890–1931), Fennicized as Nortamo, Finnish writer and doctor
 Jeffrey Nordling (b. 1962), American actor
 Raoul Nordling,  Swedish consul general in Paris during World War II
 Alan Nordling, MLA for Yukon Territory from Porter Creek South

References

Swedish-language surnames